William Williams (September 6, 1815 – September 10, 1876) was a U.S. Representative from New York, member of the New York State Assembly, railroad executive, and banker.

Early life
William Williams was born in Bolton, Connecticut on September 6, 1815 to Sarah and Samuel Williams. He grew up and attended local schools in Bolton. At the age of 17, he moved to Georgia to work in a commercial business, but returned back to Bolton after falling ill.

Career

Banking career 
He worked at a bank in Norwich, Connecticut before moving to Windham where he served as a clerk in his uncle's bank, Bank of Windham. In 1838, he moved to Sandusky, Ohio and worked as a cashier at the Bank of Sandusky. He and his wife then moved to Buffalo, New York in 1839, where he was made a partner of a banking business owned by his uncle, George C. White, and started a branch called White and Williams (later renamed White's Bank of Buffalo). He remained as a clerk there for 12 years. In 1856, Williams and some friends founded the Clinton Bank of Buffalo.

Railroad executive and soldier 
Williams was a financier, director, and president of the State Line Railroad Company, a railroad from Buffalo, New York to Erie, Pennsylvania, in the 1850s.

During the Civil War, he served under Millard Fillmore's command in the Union Continentals, a corps of home guards over the age of 45 from Upstate New York.

After the Civil War, in 1869, Williams while president of the Buffalo and Erie Railroad, helped organize its consolidation into the Lake Shore and Michigan Southern Railway. He was elected as the first vice president of the new corporation. He also served as the director of the Michigan Southern Railway, and in 1873, was elected director of the Buffalo, New York and Philadelphia Railroad Company.

Political and civic career
In 1841, Williams was elected Treasurer of Buffalo. He was elected to the Buffalo Common Council in 1845.

He was a member of the New York State Assembly in 1866 (Erie Co., 1st D.), and 1867 (Erie Co., 2nd D.).

Williams was elected as a Democrat to the Forty-second Congress (March 4, 1871 – March 3, 1873). He accepted the nomination on condition that Grover Cleveland, a lawyer in his personal attorney's office, was nominated as sheriff for Erie County, New York. He was an unsuccessful candidate for reelection in 1872 to the Forty-third Congress.

Later life
In 1874, he withdrew from public life and business due to his deteriorating health. He suffered financial losses during the Panic of 1873.

Personal life
Williams met Lovisa Kirkland Stedman while living in Windham, Connecticut. They married on October 9, 1838. They had three children: 

 Catherine Stedman Williams (1839–1841), who died young. 
 Griffin Stedman Williams (1841–1911), who married Mary Pearce Harrison, a daughter of banker James Cooke Harrison and granddaughter of lawyer Jonas Harrison, in 1871.
 Charles Gordon Williams (1847–1895), who married Georgiana Metcalfe, daughter of George Metcalfe, in 1874. 

He lived in retirement until his death at his home in Buffalo, New York on September 10, 1876. He was interred in Forest Lawn Cemetery.

References

1815 births
1876 deaths
Democratic Party members of the New York State Assembly
Democratic Party members of the United States House of Representatives from New York (state)
Buffalo Common Council members
19th-century American politicians
19th-century American railroad executives
Lake Shore and Michigan Southern Railway
American bankers
People from Bolton, Connecticut
People of New York (state) in the American Civil War
Burials at Forest Lawn Cemetery (Buffalo)